Spyros Vrontaras (born 11 December 1984) is a Greek football goalkeeper who currently plays for Olympiacos Volos.

Career
Born in Thessaloniki, Vrontaras began playing football for Panthrakikos in 2004, winning 2 elevations from Gamma Ethniki to Super League with the team. After two seasons in Super League with Panthrakikos, he signed a professional contract with Xanthi when Panthrakikos relegated to Beta Ethniki. After one season with no entries he became a free agent. In 2012, he signed a six months professional contract with Fokikos after a good season, and in the summer of 2012 signed a professional contract for Panahaiki. Vrontaras left Panachaiki in January 2013 and returned to Panthrakikos.

On 30 September 2019, Vrontaras joined Aiolikos.

References

External links
Profile in Insports.gr
Profile at Onports.gr

1984 births
Living people
Greek footballers
Panthrakikos F.C. players
Fokikos A.C. players
Xanthi F.C. players
PAE Kerkyra players
Apollon Pontou FC players
Niki Volos F.C. players
Panachaiki F.C. players
Kavala F.C. players
Aiolikos F.C. players
Association football goalkeepers
Super League Greece players
Footballers from Thessaloniki